The Bristol Blues are a summer collegiate baseball team based in Bristol, Connecticut.  It is a member of the New England Collegiate Baseball League (NECBL), a wood-bat league with a 44-game regular season that has six franchises in Massachusetts and two each in New Hampshire and Connecticut. The team's home games are played at Muzzy Field in Bristol.

Ownership
The Bristol franchise was founded for the 2015 season by Elliot Scheiner, real estate developer David Lindland, and entrepreneur Steve Lindland.

History
In the team's first season it won the Futures Collegiate Baseball League's West Division.  In the playoffs it won its quarterfinal and semifinal games, advancing to the best-of-three league championship series against the defending champion Worcester Bravehearts.  The teams split the first two games and were tied after nine innings in the third, at Muzzy Field, but the Bravehearts scored two runs in the top of the tenth to repeat as champions.

For the 2020 season, the Bristol Blues changed leagues, moving from the Futures Collegiate Baseball League to the New England Collegiate Baseball League.

References

External links
 
 League standings from Pointstreak

New England Collegiate Baseball League teams
Amateur baseball teams in Connecticut
2015 establishments in Connecticut
Baseball teams established in 2015
Bristol, Connecticut
Futures Collegiate Baseball League teams